New Hampton School is an independent college preparatory high school in New Hampton, New Hampshire, United States. It has 305 students from over 30 states and 22 countries. The average class size is eleven, and the student-faculty ratio is five to one. New Hampton School does not require a uniform.

New Hampton School is a member of the Independent Schools Association of Northern New England and is accredited by the New England Association of Schools and Colleges. The school became an International Baccalaureate World School in 2010.

History 

New Hampton School was founded on June 27, 1821, as a Free Will Baptist-oriented, coeducational institution. On that day the State of New Hampshire issued a charter to the New Hampton Academy, "having had three several readings," before the House of Representatives. That charter, issued to William B. Kelley, Nathaniel Norris and Joshua Drake, provided the framework for the institution that would become the New Hampton School and emphasized the "promotion of science and the useful arts." The school was later known as the known as the New Hampton Literary and Theological Institution. From 1854 to 1870, the Cobb Divinity School was affiliated with the institute before moving to Bates College in Maine.

Between 1925 and 1970 the school was a non-denominational school for boys. It returned to coeducation in 1970.

Academics 
New Hampton School offers the International Baccalaureate Diploma Program  and Advanced Placement classes.

Athletics
The program admits fifth-year senior basketball players who seek an additional year of preparation before entering a Division I career. Recent examples include Will Davis and Travis Souza, both of whom went on to UC Irvine.

Notable alumni 

Myles Ambrose (1926-2014), Commissioner of Customs under President Richard Nixon
Zach Auguste, basketball player
Nahum Josiah Bachelder, governor of New Hampshire 1903–1905
Cayla Barnes, ice hockey player for Boston College and US Women's National Team, 2018 Olympic gold medalist
Jamaal Branch, NFL running back
Elijah Bryant, professional basketball player for Maccabi Tel Aviv of the Israeli Premier League and the EuroLeague
Oren B. Cheney founder of Bates College
Nathan Clifford, United States Supreme Court justice
Aubrey Dawkins, basketball player
Daniel C. Eddy, Speaker of Massachusetts House of Representatives, clergyman, hymnwriter
Olivier Hanlan, basketball player
Benjamin Franklin Hayes (1836-1905), state legislator, banker, and judge
John Alfred Hayes, Civil War surgeon
Roberto Hernandez, Major League Baseball player
Harrison Carroll Hobart, Union Army colonel, second Speaker of the Wisconsin State Assembly
Marv Hubbard, football player
Robert D. Kennedy, former CEO, Union Carbide
Tyler Lydon, basketball player
Samuel W. McCall, governor of Massachusetts
Rashad McCants, professional basketball player
Hubie McDonough, professional hockey and basketball player, college and professional athletic administrator
Wes Miller, basketball coach
Lawrence Moten, professional basketball player
Walter R. Peterson, Jr., governor of New Hampshire
Will Rayman (born 1997), American-Israeli basketball player for Hapoel Haifa in the Israeli Basketball Premier League
Michael Scanlan, president of Franciscan University of Steubenville
Richard W. Sears, member of the Vermont state senate
Pete Seibert, founder, Vail Ski Resort
Ray Shero, National Hockey League administrator
Darius Songaila, professional basketball player
Jared Terrell (born 1995), basketball player in the Israeli Basketball Premier League
Jeffrey K. Tulis, political scientist
Noah Vonleh, professional basketball player
Lydia Fowler Wadleigh, educator
John Wentworth, newspaper editor, mayor of Chicago and member of Congress

References

External links
 School website

Preparatory schools in New Hampshire
Private high schools in New Hampshire
Schools in Belknap County, New Hampshire
Boarding schools in New Hampshire
New Hampton, New Hampshire
Free Will Baptist schools
Educational institutions established in 1821